Linda Olofsson (born May 24, 1973 in Vännäs, Västerbotten) is a Swedish TV-journalist.
She is currently co-hosting the debate show Argument on SVT together with Helena Wink, and was earlier the hostess of Mitt i naturen, succeeding Charlotte Permell. She was later succeeded by Martin Emtenäs.

Family 
She is daughter of the in Sweden famous TV-journalist Sverker Olofsson.

References 

1973 births
Swedish television personalities
Swedish television journalists
Swedish women television presenters
Swedish women journalists
Living people
Mid Sweden University alumni